The School of Global Policy and Strategy (GPS) at the University of California San Diego, formerly the Graduate School of International Relations and Pacific Studies (IR/PS), is devoted to the study of international affairs, economics, and policy education. Until 2015, it stood as the only professional school of international affairs that was exclusively focused on Asia and the Americas.

GPS provides a unique resource for training leaders, creating ideas, and building networks for the Pacific Century. The curriculum blends a mix of three professional school traditions-schools of international relations, public policy, and management. Interdisciplinary yet integrated curricula prepare students to perform with distinction in senior policy positions in the public and non-profit sectors, as well as in the top management of multinational firms and financial institutions. In May 2015, UC San Diego announced that IR/PS would expand its focus and become the School of Global Policy and Strategy, and that its Center on Emerging and Pacific Economies would become the Center for Global Transformation.

GPS is a full member of the Association of Professional Schools of International Affairs.  Foreign Policy magazine's 2015 rankings of the top international affairs schools placed UCSD at 7th, 13th and 13th worldwide for its PhD, master's and bachelor's programs, respectively.

Prominent faculty

Caroline Freund - Dean of the UC San Diego School of Global Policy and Strategy, former Global Director of Trade, Investment and Competitiveness of the World Bank
Peter Gourevitch - Political Scientist and Professor Emeritus 
 Stephan Haggard - Lawrence and Sallye Krause Professor of Korea-Pacific Studies; Director, Korea-Pacific Program
Lawrence B. Krause - International Economist and Professor Emeritus
Barry Naughton - Professor of Chinese Economy; Sokwanlok Chair of Chinese International Affairs
Ulrike Schaede - Professor of Japanese Business; Executive Director, Center on Emerging and Pacific Economies
Susan Shirk - Ho Miu Lam Endowed Chair in China and Pacific Relations; Director of the Institute on Global Conflict and Cooperation (IGCC); Chair, 21st Century China Program 
Barbara F. Walter - Professor, Political Scientist, and member of the Council on Foreign Relations
Emilie Hafner-Burton - John D. and Catherine T. MacArthur Professor of International Justice and Human Rights, Co-director, Laboratory on International Law and Regulation
Tai Ming Cheung - Professor, Director UC Institute on Global Conflict and Cooperation 
Gordon Hanson - Professor, Pacific Economic Cooperation Chair in International Economic Relations, Director on Global Transformation 
Peter Cowhey - former dean and Qualcomm Endowed Chair in Communications and Technology Policy

Journals
Japanese and International Economies
Journal of East Asian Studies
Journal of International Policy Solutions
Sinosphere

References

External links
UC San Diego School of Global Policy and Strategy
Center for US-Mexican Studies
21st Century China Program
Fudan-UC Center
Center on Emerging and Pacific Economies
International Law and Regulation
Policy Design and Evaluation Lab
Korea Pacific Program (KPP)
Institute on Global Conflict and Cooperation (IGCC)
Institute for International, Comparative, and Area Studies
Information Storage Industry Center
Association of Professional Schools of International Affairs
Center on Global Transformation 
Institute for Global Production and Innovation 
Japan Forum for Innovation and Technology

Global Policy and Strategy, School of
Schools of international relations in the United States
Public policy schools
Public administration schools in the United States
University subdivisions in California
Universities and colleges in San Diego
Educational institutions established in 1987
1987 establishments in California